Lior is an Israeli-born Australian singer-songwriter. 

Lior may also refer to:

People with the given name Lior:
Lior (given name)

Other:
 Lior (Fullmetal Alchemist), a fictional city in the manga and anime series Fullmetal Alchemist